Rhulani Manzini (born 6 March 1988) is a South African soccer player who plays for South African Premier Division side Tshakhuma Tsha Madzivhandila, as a forward. He has also played professionally for Batau, Jomo Cosmos, Sivutsa Stars, Witbank Spurs, Platinum Stars and AmaZulu.

Career
Born in Bushbuckridge in Mpumalanga, he began his career at Batau in 2009, before joining Jomo Cosmos in 2011. He made his debut in the South African Premier Division in December 2011 in a 2–1 victory over Platinum Stars. After spells at Sivutsa Stars and Witbank Spurs during the 2013–14 season, he joined Platinum Stars in the summer of 2014. After scoring once in nine league appearances for Platinum Stars, he signed for Chippa United in 2015. He appeared in 31 league matches for Chippa, scoring eleven goals, before leaving to join AmaZulu in August 2017. He returned to Chippa United the following summer but was released by the club in December 2019. He threatened legal action with Chippa United in 2020 after not receiving a settlement following the termination of his contract. He joined Tshakhuma Tsha Madzivhandila in November 2020.

References

External links

Living people
1988 births
South African soccer players
People from Bushbuckridge
Sportspeople from Mpumalanga
Association football forwards
Batau F.C. players
Jomo Cosmos F.C. players
Sivutsa Stars F.C. players
Witbank Spurs F.C. players
Platinum Stars F.C. players
Chippa United F.C. players
AmaZulu F.C. players
Tshakhuma Tsha Madzivhandila F.C. players
South African Premier Division players
National First Division players